Josefine Dragenberg (born 10 April 1997) is a Danish handball player who currently plays for Holstebro Håndbold.

References
 

1997 births
Living people
Danish female handball players